This is a list of existing and past lighthouses in the state of Florida in the United States.

See also
Unmanned reef lights of the Florida Keys
List of lighthouses in the United States
List of lighthouses in the United States by height
Maritime history of Florida

Notes
A. The first tower was built around 1737. Archival records are inconclusive as to whether the Spanish used the tower as a lighthouse. While it seems likely, not enough has been gathered to place it as a fact.
B. The tower was washed away in 1851.
C. In 1960, the lighthouse was replaced with a skeletal steel tower. The old structure moved multiple times as a private residence before it was returned to St. Joseph Bay in 1979. While the old light remains a private residence, its current owner has restored its former appearance with a rebuilt lantern room.

References

Sources
National Park Service, "Inventory of Historic Light Stations - Florida Lighthouses". Maritime Heritage Program. Retrieved on 2010-09-28.
U.S. Coast Guard (USCG) (2012), "Light List Vol. III, Atlantic and Gulf Coasts". U.S. Government Printing Office, Washington D.C.

"Florida Lighthouse Page". Web Archive. Retrieved on 2010-09-28.

Florida
Lighthouses
Lighthouses